The Mountain Road is a 1960 war film starring James Stewart and directed by Daniel Mann. Set in China and based on the 1958 novel of the same name by journalist-historian Theodore H. White, the film follows the attempts of a U.S. Army major to destroy bridges and roads potentially useful to the Japanese during World War II. White's time covering China for Time magazine during the war led to an interview with former OSS Major Frank Gleason Jr., who served as head of a demolition crew that inspired the story and film. Gleason was later hired as an uncredited technical consultant for the film.

The film is a rather somber treatment of World War II and includes themes that were taboo for Hollywood during the war years, such as tensions between allies and racism among American troops. The protagonist is a frustrated and morally conflicted U.S. officer unsure about the value of his mission. For these reasons, The Mountain Road is often labeled as anti-war, but it was made with the cooperation of the Pentagon, and it is much more respectful of the military as an institution than are the well-known anti-war films of the 1960s and 1970s.

As a World War II combat veteran, Stewart had vowed never to make a war film, concerned they were rarely realistic. The Mountain Road was the only war movie set during World War II in which he starred as a combatant. Stewart, however, had been featured in a wartime short, Winning Your Wings (1942) and in a civilian role in Malaya (1949). Harry Morgan, another cast member in The Mountain Road, later said he believed that Stewart made an "exception for this film because it was definitely anti-war."

Plot
In 1944, Major Baldwin (James Stewart) is ordered to blow up an airfield. Headquarters in Kunming orders him to then use his pre-war engineering expertise to delay the advancing Japanese forces as much as possible while retreating, but General Loomis (Alan Baxter) gives him the option to just return to base. Baldwin makes the riskier choice to have his first command. Loomis is reluctant to let him, because of his inexperience as a commander, but relents.

Baldwin has at his command Sergeant Michaelson (Harry Morgan), Prince (Mike Kellin), Lewis (Eddie Firestone), Miller (Rudy Bond), Collins (Glenn Corbett), the demolition team's translator, and two other soldiers, a Jeep and four trucks. Li wants Baldwin to blow up the munitions, but Baldwin does not want to go that far out of his way. Li assigns Colonel Kwan (Frank Silvera) to the team, but before they can embark, Madame Sue-Mei Hung (Lisa Lu), the American-educated widow of a general, joins them, with Baldwin gradually becoming attracted to her.

Baldwin blows up a bridge and pushes a truck over a cliff to keep on pace, trying to reach the munitions dump before the Japanese. Sue-Mei and Baldwin are at odds over his cavalier treatment of the Chinese when he resorts to blowing up a mountain road, leaving thousands of local Chinese refugees trapped. After stopping at a village because Miller is ill, Collins tries to give out the surplus food the team has brought, but is trampled to death by starving villagers. Baldwin is furious and resolute in trying to complete his mission, finally successful in blowing up the munitions storage, but when one of his trucks is stolen by Chinese bandits, Miller and Lewis are also killed. Baldwin exacts revenge by rolling a gas barrel into the bandits' outpost and setting the village on fire. Baldwin asks Sue-Mei to understand why he had to act that way, but there is no reconciliation between them as the gulf of two divergent cultures is too great and she leaves him. Although recognizing that his retribution was fundamentally excessive and brutal, Baldwin radios his report to headquarters, and is praised for fulfilling his mission.

Cast
 James Stewart as Major Baldwin
 Lisa Lu as Madame Su-Mei Hung (film debut)
 Glenn Corbett as Collins
 Harry Morgan as Sergeant Michaelson
 Mike Kellin as Prince 
 Rudy Bond as Miller
 Eddie Firestone as Lewis 
 Frank Silvera as Colonel Kwan
 James Best as Niergaard
 Alan Baxter as General Loomis
 Leo Chen as Colonel Li 
 P. C. Lee as Chinese general

Production
Although the Japanese invaders were the feared antagonists, they never appear, as The Mountain Road diverges from typical World War II action films in dealing with a more sensitive sub-plot, delving into the cultural misunderstanding and racial prejudice between American soldiers and their Chinese allies. White's original story contained a serious message that stemmed from his extended sojourn in China, first as a freelance reporter in 1938 and shortly thereafter as correspondent for Time  magazine. White found his stories depicting the corruption of the Nationalist government and warning of the growing threat of communism being rewritten by Chinese government officials with the cooperation of editors at his magazine. When he left his post and returned to the United States, in 1946, White and colleague Annalee Jacoby wrote a best-selling nonfiction book, Thunder Out of China, describing the country in wartime. His follow-up novel, The Mountain Road, also reflected his interest in a China in turmoil.

During planning, a number of actors and production staff were considered, including Marlon Brando and Robert Mitchum for the male lead role, Chinese actress Dora Ding as the female lead, James Wong Howe as director of photography, and even Don Rickles, then making a name as a "second banana" in films. Lisa Lu, who played Madame Sue-Mei Hung in her first major role, recruited P. C. Lee, Leo Chen, Richard Wang and C. N. Hu, faculty members from the Chinese Mandarin Department, Army Language School, to appear in the film.

Principal photography began on June 9, 1959, with location filming taking place at Arizona locations. Another set was erected in the vicinity of Superstition Mountain. The Fish Creek Hill Bridge on the Apache Trail was revamped to resemble the Chinese wooden bridge that is blown up, and the temple set, ammunition and supply station, as well as the airfield, were erected in Nogales. The battle scenes were filmed at the Columbia Ranch in Burbank, California. The extreme heat at the locations caused frequent cases of heat prostration among the cast and crew. Production wrapped on August 20, 1959.

Reception
Although a minor film in Stewart's repertoire, The Mountain Road was received favorably, if considered somewhat puzzling. The New York Times reviewer Howard Thompson noted, "Even with its final, philosophical overtones, this remains a curiously taciturn, dogged and matter-of-fact little picture—none too stimulating… bluntly, and none too imaginatively." Variety focused on Stewart's role, "As played by James Stewart, the American major holds the film together."

White had mixed feelings about the film. In his memoirs, he describes seeing it at a theater in Times Square where a group of teenagers sitting behind him cheered the explosions and the Americans' destruction of the village, one of them saying, "The hell with it.  That's the best part of the picture. The rest is crap." White wrote that he came to agree, saying that he had written the ending based on his experience as a reporter at the time, "refusing to acknowledge guilt in Asia…" But by the time that he wrote his memoirs, he had come to feel that the "reality of the twenty-five-year-long American record in Asia was that of genuine good will exercised in mass killing, a grisly irony which White could master neither in film nor book. Asia was a bloody place; we had no business there; novel and movie should have said just that at whatever risk."

Home media
The Mountain Road has been released on full-screen format VHS, with DVD set for release 09/16/2022  It has also been televised on the American GetTV network.

References

Notes

Citations

Bibliography

 Dolan, Edward F. Jr. Hollywood Goes to War. London: Bison Books, 1985. .
 Evans, Alun. Brassey's Guide to War Films. Dulles, Virginia: Potomac Books, 2000. .
 Hyams, Jay. War Movies. New York: W.H. Smith Publishers, Inc., 1984. .
 Jones, Ken D., Arthur F. McClure and Alfred E. Twomey. The Films of James Stewart. New York: Castle Books, 1970.
 Munn, Michael. Jimmy Stewart: The Truth Behind The Legend. Fort Lee, New Jersey: Barricade Books, 2006. . 
 Pakkula, Hannah. The Last Empress: Madame Chiang Kai-Shek and the Birth of Modern China. London: Hachette UK, 2010. .

External links
 
 
 
 

1960 films
1960 drama films
Films based on American novels
Films based on military novels
Films directed by Daniel Mann
Columbia Pictures films
World War II films based on actual events
Second Sino-Japanese War films
Films scored by Jerome Moross
Films set in China
Films shot in Arizona
Films shot in California
Films set in 1944
Films about interracial romance
1960s English-language films
American films based on actual events
American World War II films
1960s American films